Martunis Sarbini (born 2 May 1997), simply known as Martunis, is a former Indonesian footballer who played as a striker. He rose to fame in 2005 after surviving the 2004 Boxing Day tsunami and being found wandering along a beach by a group of journalists.

Early life 
Martunis was born in the village of Tibang, in the district of Syiah Kuala, Banda Aceh, Indonesia. On the morning of 26 December 2004, he was playing football with his friends in the pitch of his village when the tsunami struck. His mother and sister were amongst over 230,000 killed. He was stranded on a beach for 21 days and survived by holding onto a sofa. He was discovered by a group of journalists and found wearing a Portugal national team shirt with Rui Costa's name on the back. Due to the dehydration that he had suffered, he needed a saline drip and was said to be frail and badly bitten. His condition was so poor that a member of the Save the Children team that found him noted that if he had been found a day later, he could have perished. Later on, Martunis was reunited with his father.

When images of him wearing the Portuguese shirt surfaced, they generated massive sympathy for him, being splashed all across international publications. This attracted the attention of the Portuguese Football Federation (FPF) and Cristiano Ronaldo. The FPF donated €40,000 to help rebuild his house, while Ronaldo travelled to Banda Aceh to visit Martunis in 2005, where he promised to pay for his education and a tour of the Sporting CP stadium. Since then, the two have met multiple times.

Besides being invited to Portugal, in 2006, singer Madonna also invited Martunis and his father to London, where Madonna stayed with his family. They were both invited to tour the city's famous tourist spots, as well as other cities in the UK.

Football career 
Martunis was recruited by Sporting and became a member of their academy in Portugal. However, after a knee injury in 2016 during a charity match, he retired from playing entirely.

Life after football 
After retiring from football, Martunis tried to join the police force, but apparently failed the admission test. Currently, he is a local actor, celebrity endorser and YouTuber. His channel mostly consists of football-related content.

On 24 April 2021, Martunis joined the Democratic Party and became one of its cadres. He supports Agus Harimurti Yudhoyono.

References

External links 

Martunis Ronaldo 07 on YouTube

People from Banda Aceh
1997 births
Living people
Indonesian footballers
PSAP Sigli players
Sporting CP footballers
Victims of the 2004 Indian Ocean earthquake and tsunami
Association football forwards
Sportspeople from Aceh